Paredes de Coura is a municipality in Portugal. The population in 2011 was 9,198, in an area of 138.19 km2.

The municipality is located in the district of Viana do Castelo. The present Mayor is Prof. Vitor Paulo Pereira, elected by the Socialist Party. The municipal holiday is August 10.

Parishes
The municipality is composed of 16 parishes:

 Agualonga
 Bico e Cristelo
 Castanheira
 Cossourado e Linhares
 Coura
 Cunha
 Formariz e Ferreira
 Infesta
 Insalde e Porreiras
 Mozelos
 Padornelo
 Parada
 Paredes de Coura e Resende
 Romarigães
 Rubiães
 Vascões

Paredes de Coura Festival

The town is internationally famous for the Paredes de Coura summer rock festival.

Notable people 
 Tomás Rodrigues da Cunha (1598–1638) a Portuguese lay brother in the Order of Discalced Carmelites, known as Redemptus of the Cross. Beatified in 1900 by Pope Leo XIII

References

External links
Municipality official website
Casa de Rubiaes 
Casa da Morada 
Paredes de Coura Festival

 
Municipalities of Viana do Castelo District